Inverso Pinasca (Piedmontese: L'Invers ëd Pinasca; , French: L'Envers de Pinache) is a village and comune (municipality) with about 600 inhabitants in the Metropolitan City of Turin in the Italian region Piedmont, located about  southwest of Turin in the Val Chisone.

Inverso Pinasca borders the following municipalities: Perosa Argentina, Pinasca, Pomaretto, Villar Perosa, Pramollo, and San Germano Chisone.

References

Cities and towns in Piedmont